Kenli District is a district of the city of Dongying, in northern Shandong province. The district includes the mouth of the Yellow River. As of 2019, Kenli District has a population of 238,900.

History 
Kenli was established as a county in 1959.

In June 2016, Kenli was upgraded to a district.

Geography 

Climate 

Administrative divisions
As of 2020, Kenli District is divided into 2 subdistricts, 5 towns, and 4 .

Subdistricts 



Towns

Demographics 
According to Harvard University's China Historical GIS, Kenli had a population of 211,444 in 1999.

In the 2000 Chinese Census, Kenli had a recorded population of 242,654.

Transportation

Air 
Dongying Shengli Airport is located in the southeast of Kenli District.

Rail 
The Zibo–Dongying railway passes through the district.

References 

County-level divisions of Shandong
Dongying